The Custos Rotulorum of County Tipperary was the highest civil officer in County Tipperary. The position was later combined with that of Lord Lieutenant of Tipperary.

Incumbents

c. 1694-1704 Standish Hartstonge
1769-1806 Francis Mathew, 1st Earl Landaff
1807-1853 Francis Aldborough Prittie

For later custodes rotulorum, see Lord Lieutenant of Tipperary

References

Tipperary